Eliurus is a genus of rodent in the family Nesomyidae.
It contains the following species:
 Tsingy tufted-tailed rat (Eliurus antsingy)
 Ankarana Special Reserve tufted-tailed rat (Eliurus carletoni)
 Daniel's tufted-tailed rat (Eliurus danieli)
 Ellerman's tufted-tailed rat (Eliurus ellermani)
 Grandidier's tufted-tailed rat (Eliurus grandidieri)
 Major's tufted-tailed rat (Eliurus majori)
 Lesser tufted-tailed rat (Eliurus minor)
 Dormouse tufted-tailed rat (Eliurus myoxinus)
 White-tipped tufted-tailed rat (Eliurus penicillatus)
 Petter's tufted-tailed rat (Eliurus petteri)
 Tanala tufted-tailed rat (Eliurus tanala)
 Webb's tufted-tailed rat (Eliurus webbi)

References

 
Rodent genera
Taxa named by Henri Milne-Edwards
Taxonomy articles created by Polbot